Mirza Mustafić (born 20 June 1998) is a Bosnian professional footballer who plays as a Attacking midfielder for Bosnian Premier League club Sarajevo.

Early life
Mustafić was born on 20 June 1998 in Luxembourg City, Luxembourg, born to Bosnian parents who came to Luxembourg as immigrants due to the Bosnian War.

Club career

Borussia Monchengladbach II
Mustafić started his professional career at Borussia Mönchengladbach II.

After he passed all categories in Borussia Mönchengladbach, he signs a contract for the reserve team of that club, which at that moment competes in Regionalliga West. He stayed in the reserve team for two years in the hope of getting a call-up from the first team, but he never got it. He left the club after two years.

Elversberg
In July 2019, Mustafić signed for Elversberg who at the time was competing in the Regionalliga Südwest. In the two seasons he spent at the club, he made twenty-four appearances in league, one in the cup and three and the regional cup who won it twice. He left the club after two years.

Fola Esch
In June 2021, Mustafić joined defending champion of Luxembourg Fola Esch. In thirty-seven appearances, he scored fifteen goals. After his contract expired, he did not find an agreement for a new one and left the club as a free agent.

Sarajevo
In August 2022, Mustafić signed for Sarajevo on a free transfer. In the first round of the Cup against Čelik Zenica, he missed a penalty, eliminating Sarajevo from the cup.

Career statistics

Club

Honours
Elversberg
Saarland Cup: 2019–20, 2020–21

References

1998 births
Living people
Sportspeople from Luxembourg City
Bosnia and Herzegovina footballers
Bosnia and Herzegovina youth international footballers
Association football midfielders
Borussia Mönchengladbach II players
SV Elversberg players
CS Fola Esch players
FK Sarajevo players
Premier League of Bosnia and Herzegovina players